Atractus ventrimaculatus, the speckled ground snake,  is a species of snake in the family Colubridae. The species can be found in Venezuela.

References 

Atractus
Endemic fauna of Venezuela
Reptiles of Venezuela
Reptiles described in 1905
Taxa named by George Albert Boulenger